Macedonia, also called Macedon, was ruled continuously by kings from its inception around the middle of the seventh century BC until its conquest by the Roman Republic in 168 BC. Kingship in Macedonia, its earliest attested political institution, was hereditary, exclusively male, and characterized by dynastic politics.

Information regarding the origins of the Argeads, Macedonia's founding dynasty, is very scarce and oftentimes contradictory. The Argeads themselves claimed descent from the royal house of Argos, the Temenids, but this story is viewed with skepticism by modern scholarship as a fifth century BC fiction invented by the Argead court to impress the Greeks. It is more likely that the Argeads first surfaced as part of a tribe living near Mount Bermion who, possibly under the authority of Perdiccas, subjugated neighboring  During their reign, Macedonia would not only come to dominate Greece, but also emerge as one of the most powerful states in the ancient world with the conquest of the Persian Empire under Alexander the Great. However, Alexander's untimely death in 323 BC triggered a series of civil wars and regents for his young son Alexander IV, ultimately leading to the Argaed dynasty's demise.

Cassander, the ostensible regent of Macedonia, murdered Alexander IV in 310 and installed the Antipatrids as the ruling house. His dynasty would be short-lived, however, as his death in 297 triggered a civil war between his sons that further destabilized the kingdom. The following decades saw a rapid and violent succession of Diadochi from various dynasties, each vying for the Macedonian throne. This chaos would continue until the death of Pyrrhus in 272 and the accession of the Antigonids under Antigonus II Gonatas.

Following decades of continuous conflict, the Antigonids would see to the temporary renewal of the Kingdom's fortunes, but would ultimately be destroyed by Rome following Perseus' defeat at the battle of Pydna in 168 BC.

Argead dynasty ( – 310 BC)

Legendary 
There are two separate historical traditions relating the foundation of Macedonia and the Argead dynasty. The earlier, documented by Herodotus and Thucydides in the fifth century BC, records Perdiccas as the first king of Macedonia. The later tradition first emerged sometime at the beginning of the fourth century BC and claimed that Caranus, rather than Perdiccas, was the founder. Aside from Satyrus, who adds Coenus and Tyrimmas to the list, Marsyas of Pella, Theopompos, and Justin all agree that Caranus was Perdiccas' father. Furthermore, Plutarch claimed in his biography of Alexander the Great that all of his sources agreed that Caranus was the founder. This unhistorical assertion, like the Argive connection, is rejected by modern scholarship as court propaganda, possibly intended to diminish the significance of the name 'Perdiccas' in rival family branches following Amyntas III accession.

Historical 
Herodotus mentions the names of the five kings preceding Amyntas I, but provides no other information. Consequently, the reign dates and activities of the early Argead kings can only be guessed at. By allowing thirty years for the span of an average generation and counting backwards from the beginning of Archelaus' reign in 413 BC, British historian Nicholas Hammond estimated that the dynasty began around 650 BC. Amyntas I and his son Alexander I are the earliest kings for which we have any reliable historical information, and even then, only in the context of their relationships with Achaemenid Persia and Greeks.

Antipatrid dynasty (310–294 BC)

Dynastic conflicts (294–272 BC)

Antigonid dynasty (272–168 BC)

Non-dynastic rebel kings (150–93 BC)

Family tree

References

Notes

Citations

Partial bibliography 

 Eder, Walter; Renger, Johannes, eds. (2006). Chronologies of the Ancient World: Names, Dates, and Dynasties. Boston: Brill.
 Morby, John (1989). Dynasties of the World: A Chronological and Genealogical Handbook. Oxford University Press.

See also 
 List of ancient Macedonians

Macedon